Sectorul Centru is one of the five sectors in Chișinău, the capital of Moldova. The local administration is managed by a pretor appointed by the city administration. It governs over a portion of the city of Chișinău itself (central and western parts), and the suburban town of Codru. It is largely populated by Moldovans and Romanians.

Central Chișinău
 
 
 
 

Central or Downtown Chișinău is the central business district of Chișinău, Moldova.

Overview 
In central Chișinău are located the major governmental and business institutions of Moldova:

The Parliament
Government House
Presidential Palace
St. Teodora de la Sihla Church
Nativity Cathedral, Chișinău
National History Museum of Moldova
Embassy of the United States in Chișinău
Embassy of Romania in Chișinău
Delegation of the European Union to Moldova
Sfatul Țării Palace
Embassy of Austria, Chișinău
Embassy of Germany, Chișinău
Embassy of Hungary, Chișinău
Embassy of France, Chișinău

Monuments and memorials 
Stephen the Great Monument, the country's most prominent monument
Capitoline Wolf, Chișinău
Triumphal Arch, Chișinău
Alley of Classics, Chișinău
Monument to Simion Murafa, Alexei Mateevici and Andrei Hodorogea
Monument to Doina and Ion Aldea Teodorovici
Monument to the Victims of the Soviet Occupation
Memorial to victims of Stalinist repression

Gallery 

Sectors of Chișinău